Castle Ravenloft is a location in the plot of 1983 Dungeons & Dragons adventure module Ravenloft.

Castle Ravenloft may refer to:

 Expedition to Castle Ravenloft, released in October 2006, the expanded version of the Ravenloft module
  Castle Ravenloft Board Game, a 2010 board game published by Wizards of the Coast

See also
Ravenloft (disambiguation)